Habji Gabji is a 2022 Indian Bengali-language techno-thriller film written and directed by Raj Chakraborty. The film is jointly produced by Raj Chakraborty and Shyam Agarwal under the banners of Raj Chakraborty Entertainment and Srijan Arts respectively. The film is based on effects of online gaming on children and youth. The film features Subhashree Ganguly, Parambrata Chatterjee and Samontak Dyuti Maitra as lead characters.

Cast 
 Subhashree Ganguly as Ahana Basu 
 Parambrata Chatterjee as Aditya Basu 
 Samontak Dyuti Maitra as teen Anish Basu/Tipu 
 Osh Mallick as infant Anish Basu/Tipu 
 Suprovat Das as a Police Investigator
 Padmanabha Dasgupta as Arjun Da
 Anirban Bhattacharya as Dr. Arunangshu Roy

Soundtrack 

All the songs are composed by Indraadip Dasgupta. The lyrics are penned by Srijato and Ritam Sen.

Release 
The trailer released on 14 November 2020. The film released theatrically on 3 June 2022.

References

External links 
 

2022 films
Bengali-language Indian films
Films directed by Raj Chakraborty